Dukinfield is a town in Tameside, Greater Manchester, England.  The town and the surrounding area contains 20 listed buildings that are recorded in the National Heritage List for England.  Of these, two are listed at Grade II*, the middle grade, and the others are at Grade II, the lowest grade.  The listed buildings include farmhouses, farm buildings, houses, churches and items in churchyards, an aqueduct, railway viaducts, mills, civic buildings, cemetery buildings, and war memorials.


Key

Buildings

References

Citations

Sources

Lists of listed buildings in Greater Manchester
Listed